Vladislav Rusanov may refer to:
 Vladislav Rusanov (writer)
 Vladislav Rusanov (footballer)